Monticello is the only city in Jefferson County, Florida, United States. The population was 2,506 at the 2010 census. It is the county seat of Jefferson County. The city is named after Monticello, the estate of the county's namesake, Thomas Jefferson, on which the Jefferson County Courthouse (Monticello, Florida) was modeled.

Monticello is home to Indian mounds and many historic buildings, including the Perkins Opera House and Monticello Old Jail Museum.

Geography

U.S. Route 90 runs through the center of the city as Washington Street, leading east  to Greenville and west  to Tallahassee. U.S. Route 19 passes through the city center on Jefferson Street, leading south  to Capps and north  to Thomasville, Georgia. The two highways meet in the center of Monticello at Courthouse Circle, which surrounds the Jefferson County Courthouse. US-19 leads south from the courthouse  to Interstate 10 at Exit 225. I-10 leads west  to Tallahassee and east  to Lake City.

Demographics

2020 census

Note: the US Census treats Hispanic/Latino as an ethnic category. This table excludes Latinos from the racial categories and assigns them to a separate category. Hispanics/Latinos can be of any race.

As of the 2020 census, Monticello had a population of 2,589 and 1,192 households. The median household income was $43,780. 27.3% of the population 25 years and older had a Bachelor’s Degree or higher. There was a 49.2% employment rate. There were 1,323 housing units.

Climate

The climate in this area is characterized by hot, humid summers and generally mild winters.  According to the Köppen climate classification, Monticello has a humid subtropical climate (Cfa). Monticello is the site of the highest temperature recorded in Florida,  on June 29, 1931.

History and culture
James Patton Anderson, commander of the 1st Florida Infantry Regiment during the American Civil War, lived in Monticello. 

The Perkins Opera House is a 19th-century mercantile building that was adapted for use as a theater. It hosts regular musical performances, as well as theater productions and musicals. The first floor ballroom also holds receptions on a regular basis.

Historic sites

 Bethel School
 Christ Episcopal Church
 Denham-Lacy House
 Jefferson County Courthouse (Florida)
 Letchworth Mounds
 Lyndhurst Plantation
 Monticello High School (Florida)
 Monticello Historic District
 Monticello Old Jail Museum
 Palmer House
 Palmer-Perkins House
 Perkins Opera House
 Wirick-Simmons House

Education
Jefferson County Schools operates public schools, including Jefferson County Middle / High School.

References

External links

 City of Monticello official website

 
County seats in Florida
Cities in Jefferson County, Florida
Tallahassee metropolitan area
Cities in Florida